Cymatoceras is a wide-ranging extinct genus from the nautilitacean cephalopod family, Cymatoceratidae. They lived from the Late Jurassic to Late Oligocene, roughly from 155 to 23 Ma.

Species 
The following species of Cymatoceras have been described:

 C. albense
 C. atlas
 C. bayfieldi
 C. bifidum
 C. bifurcatum
 C. carlottense
 C. cenomanense
 C. colombiana
 C. crebricostatum
 C. deslongchampsianum
 C. eichwaldi
 C. elegans
 C. hendersoni
 C. hilli
 C. honmai
 C. hunstantonensis
 C. huxleyanum
 C. karakaschi
 C. kayeanum
 C. kossmati
 C. loricatum
 C. ludevigi
 C. manuanensis
 C. mikado
 C. neckerianum
 C. negama
 C. neocomiense
 C. pacificum
 C. paralibanoticum
 C. patagonicum
 C. patens
 C. perstriatum
 C. picteti
 C. pseudoatlas
 C. pseudoelegans
 C. pseudoneokomiense
 C. pseudonegama
 C. pulchrum
 C. radiatum
 C. renngarteni
 C. sakalavum
 C. sarysuense
 C. savelievi
 C. semilobatum
 C. sharpei
 C. tenuicostatum
 C. tourtiae
 C. tskaltsithelense
 C. tsukushiense
 C. virgatum
 C. yabei

Description 
Its shell is generally subglobular, variably involute with a rounded whorl section. Sides and venter bear conspicuous ribs. The suture is only slightly sinuous and the siphuncle position is variable.

Paracymatoceras, coeval during the Late Jurassic and Early Cretaceous differs primarily in having a more sinuous suture. Neocymatoceras tsukushiense from the Oligocene Ashiya Group of Japan, described by Kobayashi, 1954, has been reassigned to Cymatoceras.

Fossil record 
Fossils of Cymatoceras are found in marine strata from the Jurassic until the Oligocene (age range: from 155.7 to 23 million years ago.). Fossils are known from several localities:

Jurassic
Mexico

Cretaceous
Antarctica, Argentina, Armenia, Azerbaijan, Chile, Colombia (Payandé, Tolima and La Guajira), France, Georgia, Germany, Greenland, India, Italy, Japan, Kazakhstan, Madagascar, Mexico, Morocco, Mozambique, Papua New Guinea, Poland, the Russian Federation, Switzerland, Tanzania, Turkmenistan, Ukraine, the United Kingdom, United States (California, New Mexico, Texas).

Oligocene
Japan

References 

Prehistoric nautiloid genera
Late Jurassic genus first appearances
Oligocene genus extinctions
Mesozoic Antarctica
Cretaceous animals of Africa
Cretaceous animals of Asia
Cretaceous cephalopods of Europe
Jurassic cephalopods of North America
Jurassic Mexico
Cretaceous cephalopods of North America
Cretaceous Mexico
Cretaceous United States
Cretaceous animals of South America
Cretaceous Argentina
Cretaceous Chile
Cretaceous Colombia
Fossil taxa described in 1884